Martín Antonio Álvarez de Sotomayor y Soto-Flores, 1st Count of Colomera (1723–1819) was a Spanish general.

He fought in Italy during the War of the Polish Succession (1733–1735) and was marechal de camp during the 1762 war with Portugal. From 1788 to 1790 he was viceroy of Navarre and during the Anglo-Spanish War he led the Great Siege of Gibraltar until 1782, when he was relegated to command only its Spanish contingent. He was a minister and recipient of the Order of Charles III, but died without issue.

References

External links

Spanish generals
Viceroys of Navarre
1723 births
1819 deaths
18th-century Spanish military personnel
Spanish military personnel of the War of the Polish Succession
People from Lucena, Córdoba